Kahak (also known as Kerek) is a village in Bazarjan Rural District, in the Central District of Tafresh County, Markazi Province, Iran. At the 2006 census, its population was 360, in 124 families. Tati is the main language of the Kahak.

References 

Populated places in Tafresh County